Springs Flat is a suburb to the north of Whangārei in Northland, New Zealand.

Springs Flat had a population of 1,449 at the 2013 New Zealand census, an increase of 87 people since the 2006 census. There were 705 males and 741 females. Figures have been rounded and may not add up to totals. 89.6% were European/Pākehā, 17.8% were Māori, 1.1% were Pacific peoples and 2.0% were Asian.

Education 
Excellere College is a state-integrated coeducational composite (years 1–13) school with a roll of  students as of

Notes

External links 
 Excellere College website

Suburbs of Whangārei